Cryptarthria is a genus of snout moths. It was described by Roesler in 1981, and contains the species C. pseudolivalis. It is found in Papua New Guinea.

References

Phycitini
Monotypic moth genera
Moths of Oceania
Pyralidae genera